Jin Mao Xiang is a Chinese television series first broadcast on CCTV in China in 2004. It was produced in collaboration by a number of companies, including the Communication University of China. The series was aired on ATV in 2009 in Hong Kong under the title Yunzhuan Tianxia (運轉天下; literally: "Luck Changes the World").

Story
The story begins with the Che family business in the Qing Dynasty. The head of the business was mother Yugui. She had fixed her daughter Jiaoyan's marriage so that she end up with someone who was more financially stable. The daughter however was extremely unhappy since the fixed husband was fat and unattractive. The daughter was actually in love with the poor coolie boy A'long. However society would not allow a girl of reputable social status to marry a boy of low social status. The oldest brother of the family Che Weiren later committed a murder. He has been spoiled by the family riches. When the government was looking for the murderer, the coolie boy A'long innocently admitted to the crime so the brother didn't have to go to prison.

Eventually the house got weak in morale. A fisherman named Gao Lixiang came in to help the Che family business. At first he was looked down upon due to his low society status. Soon he figured out how to dye clothes. He single handed won an imperial clothing competition by making through the obstacle course with his dyed clothes. The Che family was surprised that a simple fisherman could beat the business.

Then one day a major fire broke out in a restaurant and Lixiang saved a daughter and a westerner from the crisis. The daughter turned out to be from the competing Wang family business. She tried to lure him into their family claiming the Che family treats him unfairly. After a number of business competitions he was gaining more respect in the Che family. Eventually the siblings got jealous and tried to get Lixiang kicked out of the household. Eventually the mother made Lixiang the head of the business, since he was most capable.

Eventually the business was in trouble from all the competition. But the westerner who was saved in the fire came back with a bunch of goods from the west such as magnifying glass and music boxes. They started selling western goods and the business improved again, since no one else have seen these merchandise. Later the family went into a feud between the oldest son Che Weiren and Lixiang. In setting Lixiang up, the oldest son killed an outsider, Bai Biao, who later turned out to be his own genetic father.

After a number of twists Lixiang was promoted to be the chairman of the business association above all businesses, but he was put in the chairman position because the government official liked his former fiancée Yang Danping. The oldest brother in the family soon developed a deep jealousy over the Lixiang's success who now owns his family business, his girlfriend Xu Xiaoman and his mother's trust. He sank into depression with opium addictions, and was later bribed by a government official to sell out his whole family business in exchange for unlimited opium. The mother of the family ended up in prison having been set up by the government officials. But her kids did not stand by her since they experienced too much hardship during their childhood. Lixiang ended up rescuing the family business, but soon finds the business to be unmanageable. Worse is that the mother who ran the business indirectly murdered his parents earlier. The story experience more twists and turns eventually to include the death of Qing government officials.

Cast

Cuisine reference

The show featured a dish called Squirrel whole jumping fish (松鼠活魚) from Wuzhen. The fish is cooked in a rather cruel way where the head is alive while the body is fried. If cooked correctly however, the mouth continues to move/talk even after the dish is finished. It does not contain any squirrel contrary to the name.

References

Television series set in the Qing dynasty
2004 Chinese television series debuts
Mandarin-language television shows
Chinese historical television series